Isabela SC is an association football team in Isabela, Puerto Rico that plays in the Liga Nacional de Futbol de Puerto Rico. Their debut took place during the 2012 season.

References

Association football clubs established in 2011
Isabela, Puerto Rico
Liga Nacional de Fútbol de Puerto Rico teams
Football clubs in Puerto Rico
2011 establishments in Puerto Rico